William Henry Munday (24 January 1876 – 21 March 1944) was an Australian rules footballer who played with Geelong in the Victorian Football League (VFL).

Notes

External links 

1876 births
1944 deaths
Australian rules footballers from Victoria (Australia)
Geelong Football Club players